Plesionida is a genus of squat lobsters in the family Munididae. , it contains the following species:
 Plesionida aliena (Macpherson, 1996) — New Caledonia, Fiji, and Tonga, .
 Plesionida aurelia  — Northwestern Australia, .
 Plesionida concava  — Solomon Islands, .
 Plesionida psila Baba & de Saint Laurent, 1996 — New Caledonia, .

The generic name is a combination of the Greek plesios, meaning "near" and the final syllables of Munida. Its gender is feminine.

References

Further reading

External links

Squat lobsters